Cypsiurus is a genus of the swift family of birds.

There are three species
 Asian palm swift, Cypsiurus balasiensis
 African palm swift, Cypsiurus parvus
 Malagasy palm swift, Cypsiurus gracilis

These very similar species were formerly considered to be conspecific.

They have mainly pale brown plumage and long swept-back wings that resemble a crescent or a boomerang. The body is slender, and the tail is long and deeply forked, although it is usually held closed. The sexes are similar, and young birds differ from adults mainly in their shorter tails. Palm swifts have very short legs which they use only for clinging to vertical surfaces, since swifts never settle voluntarily on the ground.

These swifts spend most of their lives in the air, living on flying insects. Palm swifts often feed near the ground, and they drink on the wing.

References 
 Barlow, Wacher and Disley, Birds of The Gambia 
 Chantler and Driessens, Swifts 
 Grimmett, Inskipp and Inskipp, Birds of India 

 
Bird genera
Taxa named by René Lesson